Old Northam Road is a  road in the outer eastern suburbs of Perth, Western Australia. It terminates at Great Eastern Highway at both ends, and forms the main street of the town of Chidlow.

It was previously considered a main route from Perth to Northam, along with the alternative route via The Lakes, which is now part of Great Eastern Highway.

See also

References

Roads in Perth, Western Australia
Chidlow, Western Australia